Manuel Negrete may refer to:

Manuel Negrete Arias, Mexican football (soccer) player
Manuel Negrete (shooting), Chilean individual that was allegedly killed by Armed Forces